Chizuk Amuno Synagogue (Hebrew: ק"ק חזוק אמונה), is a historic building on the National Register of Historic Places in Baltimore, Maryland. It was once used by the Chizuk Amuno Congregation. It is part of the Jewish Museum of Maryland and is currently used by the B'nai Israel Congregation.

It was listed on the National Register of Historic Places in 1978.

References

External links
, including photo from 1997, at Maryland Historical Trust

Jonestown, Baltimore
Properties of religious function on the National Register of Historic Places in Baltimore
Synagogues in Baltimore
Gothic Revival architecture in Maryland
Synagogues completed in 1876
Synagogues on the National Register of Historic Places in Maryland
Former synagogues in Maryland